Americanist phonetic notation, also known as the North American Phonetic Alphabet (NAPA), the Americanist Phonetic Alphabet or the American Phonetic Alphabet (APA), is a system of phonetic notation originally developed by European and American anthropologists and language scientists (many of whom were students of Neogrammarians) for the phonetic and phonemic transcription of indigenous languages of the Americas and for languages of Europe. It is still commonly used by linguists working on, among others, Slavic, Uralic, Semitic languages and for the languages of the Caucasus and of India; however, Uralists commonly use a variant known as the Uralic Phonetic Alphabet.

Despite its name, the term "Americanist phonetic alphabet" has always been widely used outside the Americas.

Diacritics are widely used in Americanist notation. Unlike the International Phonetic Alphabet (IPA), which seeks to use as few diacritics as possible for phonemic distinctions, restricting diacritics to phonetic detail, the Americanist notation relies on diacritics for basic consonants and vowels.

Summary contrast with the IPA alphabet
Over the years, NAPA has drawn closer to the IPA. This can be seen, for example, in a comparison of Edward Sapir's earlier and later works. However, there remain significant differences. Among these are:

Palato-alveolar  and sometimes alveopalatal 
Advancing diacritic (inverted breve) for dentals and palatals (apart from non-sibilant dental ), and retracting diacritic (a dot) for retroflex and uvulars (apart from uvular )
Ogonek for nasalization
Dot over vowel for centering, two dots (diaeresis) over a vowel to change fronting (for front rounded vowels and unrounded back vowels)
Acute and grave accents over vowels for stress

History 
John Wesley Powell used an early set of phonetic symbols in his publications (particularly Powell 1880) on American language families, although he chose symbols which had their origins in work by other phoneticians and American writers (e.g., Pickering 1820; Cass 1821a, 1821b; Hale 1846; Lepsius 1855, 1863; Gibbs 1861; and Powell 1877). The influential anthropologist Franz Boas used a somewhat different set of symbols (Boas 1911). In 1916, a publication by the American Anthropological Society greatly expanded upon Boas's alphabet. This same alphabet was discussed and modified in articles by Bloomfield & Bolling (1927) and Herzog et al. (1934). The Americanist notation may be seen in the journals American Anthropologist, International Journal of American Linguistics, and Language. Useful sources explaining the symbols – some with comparisons of the alphabets used at different times – are Campbell (1997:xii-xiii), Goddard (1996:10–16), Langacker (1972:xiii-vi), Mithun (1999:xiii-xv), and Odden (2005).

It is often useful to compare the Americanist tradition with another widespread tradition, the International Phonetic Alphabet (IPA). Americanist phonetic notation does not require a strict harmony among character styles: letters from the Greek and Latin alphabets are used side-by-side. Another contrasting feature is that, to represent some of the same sounds, the Americanist tradition relies heavily on letters modified with diacritics; whereas the IPA, which reserves diacritics for other specific uses, gave Greek and Latin letters new shapes. These differing approaches reflect the traditions' differing philosophies. The Americanist linguists were interested in a phonetic notation that could be easily created from typefaces of existing orthographies. This was seen as more practical and more cost-efficient, as many of the characters chosen already existed in Greek and East European orthographies.

Abercrombie (1991:44–45) recounts the following concerning the Americanist tradition:

Alphabet

Consonants 
There is no central authority. The Western Institute for Endangered Language Documentation (WIELD) recommends the following conventions:

Palatalization is written . Labialization, velarization, aspiration, voicelessness and prenasalization are as in the IPA. Pharyngeals, epiglottals and glottals are as in the IPA, as are implosives and clicks. 

Notes:
 Among the dental fricatives,  are slit fricatives (non-sibilant) while  are sulcalized (sibilant).

Rhotics table 
Most languages only have one phonemic rhotic consonant (only about 18% of the world's languages have more than one rhotic). As a result, rhotic consonants are generally transcribed with the  character. This usage is common practice in Americanist and also other notational traditions (such as the IPA). This lack of detail, although economical and phonologically sound, requires a more careful reading of a given language's phonological description to determine the precise phonetics. A list of rhotics is given below.

Other flaps are  etc.

Common alternate symbols 
There are many alternate symbols seen in Americanist transcription. Below are some equivalent symbols matched with the symbols shown in the consonant chart above.

 ʸ may be used for fronted velars (e.g., kʸ = k̯, gʸ = g̑)
 Some transcriptions superscript the onset of doubly articulated consonants and the release of fricatives, e.g. , .
 There may be a distinction between laminal retroflex  and apical retroflex  in some transcriptions.
 The fronting diacritic may be a caret rather than an inverted breve, e.g. dental  and palatal .
Many researchers use the x-caron (x̌) for the voiceless uvular fricative. 

The use of the standard IPA belted l (ɬ) for the voiceless lateral fricative is becoming increasingly common.

Pullum & Ladusaw 
According to Pullum & Ladusaw (1996), typical Americanist usage at the time was more-or-less as follows. There was, however, little standardization of rhotics, and  may be either retroflex or uvular, though as noted above  or  may be a retroflex flap vs  as a uvular trill. Apart from the ambiguity of the rhotics below, and minor graphic variants (ȼ g γ for c ɡ ɣ and the placement of the diacritic in g̑ γ̑), this is compatible with the WIELD recommendations. Only precomposed affricates are shown below; others may be indicated by digraphs (e.g. ).

Ejectives and implosives follow the same conventions as in the IPA, apart from the ejective apostrophe being placed above the base letter.

Pike 
Pike (1947) provides the following set of symbols:

Voiceless, voiced and syllabic consonants may also be C̥, C̬ and C̩, as in IPA. Aspirated consonants are C or C̥ʰ / C̬ʱ. Non-audible release is indicated with superscripting, VC.

Fortis is C͈ and lenis C᷂. Labialization is C̮ or Cʷ; palatalization is Ꞔ, C⁽ⁱ⁾ or Cʸ; velarization is C⁽ᵘ⁾, and pharyngealization is C̴.

Other airstream mechanisms are pulmonic ingressive C←, ejective Cˀ, implosive Cˤ, click C˂, and lingual ejective (spurt) C˃.

Anthropos 
The journal Anthropos published the alphabet to be used in their articles in 1907. Although European, it is the same basic system that Sapir and Boas introduced to the United States. Transcription is italic, without other delimiters.

Palatalized consonants are written with an acute –  etc. Semivowels are  etc.

Vowels 
WIELD recommends the following conventions. It doesn't provide characters for distinctions that aren't attested in the literature:

No distinction is made between front and central for the lowest unrounded vowels. Nasal vowels are e.g. . Long vowels are e.g. . Voicelessness is e.g. , as in the IPA. Creak, murmur, rhoticity et al. are as in the IPA.

Pullum & Ladusaw
According to Pullum & Ladusaw (1996), typical Americanist usage at the time was more-or-less as follows:

Pike
Pike (1947) presents the following:

Nasalization is V̨ or Vⁿ. A long vowel is V꞉ or Vꞏ; half-long is V‧ (raised dot). Positional variants are fronted V˂, backed V˃, raised V˄ and lowered V˅.

Anthropos 
Vowels are inconsistent between languages.  etc. may be used for unrounded central vowels, and the -based letters are poorly defined, with height and rounding confounded. 

There are actually three heights of low front and back vowels.  is also seen for a low back vowel.

Reduced (obscure) vowels are  etc. There are also extra-high vowels  etc.

Bloch & Trager

Bloch & Trager (1942) proposed the following schema, which was never used. They use a single dot for central vowels and a dieresis to reverse backness.

Kurath
Kurath (1939) is as follows. Enclosed in parentheses are rounded vowels.

Chomsky & Halle

Chomsky & Halle (1968) proposed the following schema, which was hardly ever used.

Tone and prosody 
Pike (1947) provides the following tone marks:

High: V́ or V¹
Mid: V̍ or V²
Norm: V̄ or V³
Low: V̀ or V⁴

Stress is primary ˈCV or V́ and secondary ˌCV or V̀.

Short or intermediate and long or final 'pauses' are |, ||, as in IPA. 

Syllable division is CV.CV, as in IPA, and morpheme boundaries are CV-CV.

Historical charts of 1916 

The following charts were agreed by committee of the American Anthropological Association in 1916.

The vowel chart is based on the classification of H. Sweet. The high central vowels are differentiated by moving the centralizing dot to the left rather than with a cross stroke. IPA equivalents are given in a few cases that may not be clear. 

Notes:
 surd = voiceless; sonant = voiced; intermed. = partially voiced
 In the glottalized stop column, the phonetic symbol appearing on the left side (which is a consonant plus an overhead single quotation mark) represents a weakly glottalized stop (i.e. weakly ejective). The symbol on the right side is strongly glottalized (i.e. it is articulated very forcefully). Example:  = weakly glottalized,  = strongly glottalized. (Cf.  = [k] followed by glottal stop.) This convention is only shown for the glottalized stops, but may be used for any of the glottalized consonants.
 "Laryngeal" refers to either pharyngeal or epiglottal.

Variation between authors
Following are symbols that differ among well-known Americanist sources.

See also 
 Phonetic transcription
 International Phonetic Alphabet
 English Phonetic Alphabet
 Uralic Phonetic Alphabet
 Teuthonista
 Phonetics
 Phonology

References

External links 
 Recommendations of WIELD for Americanist notation

Bibliography 
 Abercrombie, David. (1991). Daniel Jones's teaching. In D. Abercrombie, Fifty years in phonetics: Selected papers (pp. 37–47). Edinburgh: Edinburgh University Press. (Original work published 1985 in V. A. Fromkin (Ed.), Phonetic linguistics: Essays in honor of Peter Ladefoged, Orlando, Academic Press, Inc.).
 Albright, Robert W. (1958). The International Phonetic Alphabet: Its background and development. International journal of American linguistics (Vol. 24, No. 1, Part 3); Indiana University research center in anthropology, folklore, and linguistics, publ. 7. Baltimore. (Doctoral dissertation, Stanford University, 1953).
 American Anthropological Society [Boas, Franz; Goddard, Pliny E.; Sapir, Edward; & Kroeber, Alfred L.]. (1916). Phonetic transcription of Indian languages: Report of committee of American Anthropological Association. Smithsonian miscellaneous collections (Vol. 66, No. 6). Washington, D.C.: Smithsonian Institution (American Anthropological Society).
 Bloomfield, Leonard; & Bolling George Melville. (1927). What symbols shall we use? Language, 3 (2), 123–129.
 Boas, Franz. (1911). Introduction. In F. Boas (Ed.), Handbook of American Indian languages (pp. 5–83). Bureau of American Ethnology bulletin (No. 40). Washington. (Reprinted 1966).
 Campbell, Lyle. (1997). American Indian languages: The historical linguistics of Native America. New York: Oxford University Press. .
 Clark, John; & Yallop, Colin. (1995). An introduction to phonetics and phonology (2nd ed.). Oxford: Blackwell. .
 Odden, David. (2005). Introducing phonology. Cambridge University Press.  (hbk);  (pbk).
 Goddard, Ives. (1996). Introduction. In I. Goddard (Ed.), Handbook of North American Indians: Languages (Vol. 17, pp. 1–16). (W. C. Sturtevant, General Ed.). Washington, D. C.: Smithsonian Institution. .
 Herzog, George; Newman, Stanley S.; Sapir, Edward; Swadesh, Mary Haas; Swadesh, Morris; Voegelin, Charles F. (1934). Some orthographic recommendations. American Anthropologist, 36 (4), 629–631. 
 Hill, Kenneth C. (1988). [Review of Phonetic symbol guide by G. K. Pullum & W. Ladusaw]. Language, 64 (1), 143–144.
 International Phonetic Association. (1949). The principles of the International Phonetic Association, being a description of the International Phonetic Alphabet and the manner of using it, illustrated by texts in 51 languages. London: University College, Department of Phonetics.
 Kemp, J. Alan. (1994). Phonetic transcription: History. In R. E. Asher & J. M. Y. Simpson (Eds.), The encyclopedia of language and linguistics (Vol. 6, pp. 3040–3051). Oxford: Pergamon.
 Langacker, Ronald W. (1972). Fundamentals of linguistic analysis. New York: Harcourt Brace Jovanovich.
 MacMahon, Michael K. C. (1996). Phonetic notation. In P. T. Daniels & W. Bright (Ed.), The world's writing systems (pp. 821–846). New York: Oxford University Press. .
 Maddieson, Ian. (1984). Patterns of sounds. Cambridge studies in speech science and communication. Cambridge: Cambridge University Press.
 Mithun, Marianne. (1999). The languages of Native North America. Cambridge: Cambridge University Press.  (hbk); .
 Pike, Kenneth L. (1943). Phonetics: A critical analysis of phonetic theory and a technic for the practical description of sounds. Ann Arbor: University of Michigan Press.
 ———— (1947) Phonemics: A Technique for Reducing Languages to Writing. Ann Arbor: University of Michigan Press.
 Powell, John W. (1880). Introduction to the Study of Indian languages, with words, phrases, and sentences to be collected (2nd Ed.). Washington: Government Printing Office.
 Pullum, Geoffrey K.; & Laduslaw, William A. (1986). Phonetic symbol guide. Chicago: University of Chicago Press. .
 Sturtevant, William C. (Ed.). (1978–present). Handbook of North American Indians (Vol. 1–20). Washington, D. C.: Smithsonian Institution. (Vols. 1–3, 16, 18–20 not yet published).

Phonetic alphabets